World cinema is a term in film theory that refers to films made outside of the American motion picture industry, particularly those in opposition to the aesthetics and values of commercial American cinema. The Third Cinema of Latin America and various national cinemas are commonly identified as part of world cinema. The term has been criticized for Americentrism and for ignoring the diversity of different cinematic traditions around the world.

Types
World cinema has an unofficial implication of films with "artistic value" as opposed to "Hollywood commercialism." Foreign language films are often grouped with "art house films" and other independent films in DVD stores, cinema listings etc.
Unless dubbed into one's native language, foreign language films played in English-speaking regions usually have English subtitles. Few films of this kind receive more than a limited release and many are never played in major cinemas. As such the marketing, popularity and gross takings for these films are usually markedly less than for typical Hollywood blockbusters. The combination of subtitles and minimal exposure adds to the notion that "World Cinema" has an inferred artistic prestige or intelligence, which may discourage less sophisticated viewers. Additionally, differences in cultural style and tone between foreign and domestic films affects attendance at cinemas and DVD sales.

Foreign language films can be commercial, low brow or B-movies. Furthermore, foreign language films can cross cultural boundaries, particularly when the visual spectacle and style is sufficient to overcome people's misgivings. Films of this type became more common in the early 2000s, as Crouching Tiger, Hidden Dragon, Amélie,  Brotherhood of the Wolf, Y Tu Mama Tambien and Talk to Her enjoyed great successes in United States cinemas and home video sales. The first foreign and foreign language film to top the North American box office was Hero in August 2004.  "The rule for foreign-language films is that if you've done $5 million or better (in United States cinemas), you've had a very nice success; if you do $10 (million) or better (in United States cinemas), you're in blockbuster category," Warner Independent Pictures ex-president Mark Gill said.

On the other hand, English-dubbed foreign films rarely did well in United States box office (with the exception of anime films).  The 1982 United States theatrical release of Wolfgang Petersen's Das Boot was the last major release to go out in both original and English-dubbed versions, and the film's original version actually grossed much higher than the English-dubbed version.  Later on, English-dubbed versions of international hits like Un indien dans la ville, Godzilla 2000, Anatomy, Pinocchio and High Tension flopped at United States box office.   When Miramax planned to release the English-dubbed versions of Shaolin Soccer and Hero in the United States cinemas, their English-dubbed versions scored badly in test screenings in the United States, so Miramax finally released the films in United States cinemas with their original language.

See also
 Awards
 Academy Award for Best International Feature Film
 César Award for Best Foreign Film
 Jutra Award
 Cairo International Film Festival
 Dhaka University Film Society
 Eurocinema
 History of film
 List of cinema of the world
 Lists of highest-grossing films
 List of films by box office admissions
 List of highest-grossing non-English films
 Transnational cinema
 World Cinema Foundation

References

 World
 World